The following is a list of festivals in Iran.

Iranian festivals 
 Noruz: no means new and the word ruz means day, so Nowruz means starting a new day and it is the Celebration of the start of spring (Rejuvenation). It starts on the first day of spring (also the first day of the Iranian Calendar year), 21 March, in that 12 days as a sign of the past 12 months, all Iranian families gather around and visit each other. It is also the best time to re-experience the feeling of mehr (pure love). In Norouz all families talk about their best experiences of the last year and the things they are looking forward in the next year and they all become bonded again in peace. There are many other things Iranians do for nowruz including khane tekani (cleaning the house) and haji firooz, where a person who makes his face black and wears a red dress, walks around the streets and entertains people by singing a special song.
 
Sofre-ye Haft-Sin: sofre (tablecloth), haft (seven), sin (the letter S [س]). Al-Bīrūnī said: Haft-sin came from Jamshid since he destroyed the evil that made Persian lands weak, so in first day of Iranian calendar people celebrated Norouz and they put 7 different symbolic items on their table as a sign of thanking nature for giving humans all they need. Since then every year Iranians put Haft-sin on their tables, but nowadays they put 7 things that start with letter "S". Some people also believe that Sasanians had a very beautiful plate that was given to them from China and they called it chini plate, and after some years the word chini changed into sini (a beautiful plate) so people would put 7 things in a sini.
Sizdah Bedar: Persian Festival of "Joy and Solidarity". The 13th and last day of Norouz celebration. Because of the end of twelve days (a sample of twelve month) they celebrate the 13th day as a new beginning of the next twelve month and it has no relations with the number 13 (as an unlucky number). It is celebrated outdoors along with the beauty of nature. Al-Bīrūnī also called this day: tir ruz: blissed day.
 Mehregan: Festival of Mehr (or Mithra). A day of thanksgiving. It is a day which everyone show the mehr or the love they have for each other and it is one of the most important days in the year.
 Jashn-e Sade: A mid-winter feast to honor fire and to "defeat the forces of darkness, frost and cold" in which people gather around and build a fire so that they can receive good things from the fire and give the fire their incompleteness.
Shab-e Yalda: Also known as The turning point. End of the longest night (darkness) of the year, and beginning of growing of the days (Lights). A celebration of Good over Evil. Also known as they have special nuts for that night.
 Sepandarmazgan: Day of Love, Friendship and Earth in ancient Persian culture.
 Chaharshanbe Suri: Festival of Fire, last Wednesday night in the Iranian Calendar year. It marks the importance of the light over the darkness, arrival of spring and revival of nature.

Zoroastrianism 

The basis of nearly all of Iranian national festivals are from its Pre-Islamic Zoroastrian era. However, there are some festivals that are celebrated exclusively by Zoroastrians and some with less extent in other communities too.
Khordadgân: Celebration of the 6th day of Iranian calendar. Khordad is one of the Izadans name which means completeness. In this day people used to go near the river or a sea to thank God for everything and they gave each other flowers as a sign of happiness.
 Bahmanagân: Also maintained by Iranian Muslims until the Mongol invasion. The festival was celebrated on the second day of the month of Bahman. Bahmanjana is a later modified form of Bahmanagân.
 Sepandarmazgân Bahmanagân: Esfandegān or Spandegān is the day of love.
 Farvardingân: Festival of the Forouhar .
 Jašne Sade: Festival of Fire. Lit. the 100th day (before Nowruz).
 Jašne Mehregân: Festival of Mihr (or Mehr). A day of thanksgiving dedicated to the highest Angel, Mithra (c.f. Metatron).
 Jašne Tiregân: Festival of Tir. A day dedicated to Tishtrya, Angel of the star Sirius and rain. Also celebrated in some Muslim regions in Iran including Mazandaran.
 Nowruz: New Year's Day. March (first day of Spring).
Khordad Sal: Birthday of the Prophet Zarathushtra.
 Zartosht No-Diso: Anniversary commemorating the death of the Prophet Zarathushtra.
Azargân: The day of fire commonly held by Zoroastrians in their Fire Temples.

 Abanegân: A celebration for the goddess Naheed (Anahita).

 Amordadegân: without Death

Islamic 

 Eid-e Fetr: "The Festival of Fast-Breaking" which comes at the end of Ramadan. People give gifts and money to the poor, the sick and others.
 Ramadan (Ramazan in Persian): Iranians have special recipes as Zoolbia-Bamieh, Shole Zard, Ferni, Halva and Ash Reshteh in Ramezan.
 Nimeh Şaabân: celebration for the twelfth and final Shi'a Imam. The festival consists of some fireworks and decorating the cities with lights, bulbs and trees.
Shab-e Qadr: the "Night of Qadr" towards the end of Ramadan, which is when the first verses of the Qur'an were revealed to Muhammad. Iranians stay awake during the nights and some light candles and listen to Dua while reciting the Qur'an.
 Eid-e Qurban: "The Festival of Sacrifice". In Iran, some wealthy people and farmers sacrifice their herds and offer the meat to neighbors and the poor as charity.
Eid-e Ghadir Khumm: is a Shia feast, and is considered to be among the "significant" feasts of Shia Islam. The Eid is held on 18 Dhu Al-Hijjah at the time when the Islamic prophet Muhammad (following instruction from Allah) was said to have appointed Ali ibn Abi Talib as his successor.
 Shiite and Sunni unity week for the birth of the Prophet of Islam: 12-17 Rabiʽ al-Awwal
 Birth of Hasan ibn Ali: 15 Ramadan
 Birth of Husayn ibn Ali: 3 Sha'ban
 Birth of Ali ibn Husayn Zayn al-Abidin: 5 Sha'ban
 Birth of Ali al-Akbar ibn Husayn (Young Day): 11 Sha'ban
 Birth of Ali ibn Abi Talib: 13 Rajab
 Fatimah bint Musa birthday (Girl's Day): 1 taste
 Birth of Ali al-Ridha: 11 Dhu al-Qadah
 Eid al-Fitr of the Prophet of Islam: 27 Rajab
 Celebrating the beginning of the Imamate of Muhammad al-Mahdi: 9th of Rabiʽ al-Awwal
 Marriage celebration of Ali ibn Abi Talib and Fatimah: 1 Dhu al-Hijjah

Christian 
The majority of Iranian Christians are Armenian-Iranians also known as Parska-Hye who follow the Armenian Apostolic Church, an Oriental Orthodox branch of Christianity. This minority has their very own special festivals and traditions.

There is also a significant minority of Assyrian people who follow the Oriental Orthodox Christian Assyrian Church of the East and the Chaldean Catholic Church, these two church groups also have a minority of Persian followers. The followers of this church have a blend of Persian and Assyrian culture. 

Iran has an overwhelmingly Muslim population but the Christian Community has a visible presence. During Christmas times, Christmas trees can be seen from windows in Tehran and north-western provinces. Although Christmas has an official recognition in Iran, it is not a national holiday.

Jewish 
 Purim Festival
 Illanout (tree festival) Celebrated in February, it is identical to Shab-e Cheleh and is a lot more elaborate, reminiscence of the pre-Islamic celebrations
 Shab-e Sal, lit. Night of the Year: The night of the end of Passover, when chametz can once again be eaten. It is usually celebrated with many types of breads and dairy items. This festival is unique to Persian Jews due to the holiday’s proximity to Nowruz and is not celebrated in this way by most other Jews, just as the holiday itself is celebrated in a fashion unique to Persian Jews, Shab-e Sal has similarities to the Moroccan Jewish holiday Mimouna. The day after Passover is similarly known as Rooz-e Sal.

Unofficial 
 New Year's Day
 Valentine's Day
 Halloween

References

Bibliography 
 Shirzad Aghaee, Nouruz - Berliyan-negin-e jashnha-yi irani va digar jashnha va jashn-aiyinha-yi mardomi-yi iran (Nouruz and other Iranian National Festivals), Stockholm, Sweden, 2002.
 Festivals in Encyclopædia Iranica

 
Iran
Festivals
Iran
Iran
Iran
Iran
Festivals